The Grand Faw Port (Arabic: ميناء الفاو الكبير) (Romanized: mina'a al faw al kabir) is a port under construction on the coast of Iraq, on the northern tip of the Persian Gulf.

The port is considered a strategic national project for Iraq and will become one of the largest ports in the world and the largest in the Middle East, in addition, the port will strengthen Iraq’s geopolitical position in the region and the world.

History 
The port is located in the Faw peninsula, south of Basra. The history of this project dates back to after the Second World War, then was re-presented in the seventies, and the first serious and operational implementation steps began in the eighties, but after the outbreak of the Iran-Iraq war, the project was halted. After the military invasion of Iraq led by United States and allies, and the fall of the previous regime, major international investment companies headed to Iraq to re-propose the implementation of the project. A proposal was made by a major investment company and the construction phase was supposed to be completed, and the operation to be started by 2038. But the Ministry of Transport turned it down and made major design changes. The ministry’s changes aimed to expand the project size from 12 to 54 square km, establish about 100 berths for unloading and loading different types of goods, construct power plants, water desalination plants, construct a container area with an area of more than one million square meters, and a multi-purpose yard with an area of 600 square km. As well as the constructing of refineries for oil derivatives, a petrochemical plant, and expanding the railway stations connection Basra with the other governorates in Iraq, and the construction of new one to connect Faw Peninsula with Basra. Furthermore, Iraq is planning to establish large naval base in the Faw peninsula.

According to experts, the delay of the project is related to financial, technical, and internal and external political problems, which greatly delayed the completion of the first phase of the project.

Overview 
The project was first official proposed and announced in 2010, however countless delays due to the conflict in Iraq, and the blockade by cash shortages due to internal hostilities and low oil prices. caused the project to be halted. However finally, in 2020 the Prime Minister of Iraq Mustafa al-Kadhimi launched the second phase of the port, with South Korean company Daewoo Engineering winning the $2.7billion contracts for the port in December. Several other companies fought for the contracts including Chinese, Emirati and American companies.

Iraq hopes will create a shorter transportation corridor between the Middle East and Europe, bypassing the Suez Canal, through the eventual expansion of a national rail network.

Construction 
The breakwaters of the port have already been completed costing over 1 billion dollars, they became the world's longest at 14.523 km. The breakwaters were constructed by Daewoo Engineering & Construction Co. Ltd (South Korea), GCPI (Iraq) and TECHNITAL (Italy) in Basra, Iraq on 2 April 2020 as recognized by Guinness world record.

Construction on the first sections of the main berth has begun, as well as roads, and a tunnel to connect it to Um-Qasr port across the Khor-Al-Zubair waterway.

References

External links
 https://www.globalconstructionreview.com/iraqs-al-faw-port-to-become-largest-in-middle-east/
 https://www.hellenicshippingnews.com/iraq-lays-cornerstone-for-next-phase-of-grand-port-of-al-faw-project-in-basra-2/
 https://www.guinnessworldrecords.com/world-records/76023-largest-breakwaters

Ports and harbours of Iraq
Basra Governorate
Naval installations
Ports and harbours of the Arab League
Transport in the Arab League